Frenchtown (formerly, French Creek) is an unincorporated community in El Dorado County, California.

The place was originally a mining camp set up by French Canadian and French miners.

References

French-American culture in California
French-Canadian culture in the United States
Unincorporated communities in California
Unincorporated communities in El Dorado County, California